The Makassar class is a class of South Korean-designed Landing Platform Dock. The lead ship is named after the city of Makassar in Sulawesi and built in Busan, South Korea. The ships were designed by Daesun Shipbuilding & Engineering Co. based on their earlier design of Tanjung Dalpele class that was sold to the Indonesian Navy.

Exports

Indonesia

Indonesia signed a US$150 million contract in December 2004 and the first two units were built in Busan, South Korea. The remaining two were built at Indonesia's PT PAL shipyard in Surabaya with assistance from Daesun.The contract for the 3rd and 4th LPD to be built in Indonesia was signed with PT PAL on March 28, 2005.

On 19 October 2006, the first of the two Indonesian-built units, was laid down in a ceremony by Admiral Slamet Subiyanto, Chief of Staff, Indonesian Navy. The 3rd and 4th units had been designed to function as flagships with provisions for a command and control system, 57mm gun and air defence systems.

The 5th ship ordered by Indonesian navy on January 11, 2017. First steel cutting ceremony for said ship was conducted on April 28, 2017. The ship's keel was laid on August 28. 2017.

Philippines

The Philippine Navy selected a variant of the Makassar class design from PT PAL, called the Tarlac class for its Strategic Sealift Vessel (SSV) programme following competitive bidding in 2013, and the contract for two units was signed on 23 January 2014. The first unit was laid down at PT PAL Surabaya on 22 January 2015 and the second unit was laid down on 5 June 2015.

On June 24, 2022 PT PAL signed a contract with Philippine Department of Defence for the purchase of an additional two units. According to PT PAL, these new ships will improve upon previous Tarlac class SSVs, allowing it to sail in waters up to sea state 6, as well as operating ship facilities at sea state 4.

Peru

The Peruvian Navy selected the Makassar class for the Buque Multipropósito program from Dae Sun Shipbuilding and Engineering Co. in 2012. First ship of the class was laid down in the SIMA Callao shipyard on July 12, 2013; A second unit is also planned.

Malaysia

During Indo Defence 2016, a MoU was signed between Indonesia's PT PAL and Malaysia's Boustead Naval Shipyard (BNS) for a collaboration on the Royal Malaysian Navy's new class of multirole support ship (MRSS), based on an enlarged Makassar-class LPD, which would have an overall length of 150m.

Myanmar 

In 2019, Dae Sun Shipbuilding of South Korea built a Makassar-class LPD named  for the Myanmar Navy.

Brazil 
In 2019 the Peruvian Navy, offered a new Peruvian built Makassar class to Brazil for US$170m, in exchange for 2 used Type 209 submarines. On October 24, Brazilian Vice President Hamilton Mourão signed a Declaration of Intent with the Peruvian government for this exchange.

United Arab Emirates 
On 1 July 2022, United Arab Emirates Navy signed a contract with PT PAL Indonesia for the purchase of one Makassar-class LPD.

Ships of class

References

External links

 PT. PAL
 Makassar Class Landing Platform Docks, Indonesia
 Daesun Shipbuilding & Engineering Co.
 KAPAL PERANG JENIS LPD KRI MAKASSAR-590 TIBA DI SURABAYA
 PAL launches mily LPD ship

Amphibious warfare vessels of the Indonesian Navy
Amphibious warfare vessel classes